Rockology is an album by former Kiss drummer Eric Carr released in 1999. On December 20th, 2020, Rockology was re-released on Spotify.

The album features songs that Carr was working on before his death in 1991 which was completed by his former Kiss bandmate Bruce Kulick. Several of the songs featured were intended for use on Kiss albums, such as "Eyes of Love" and "Somebody's Waiting". Others were written for Carr's Rockheads animated television series that never got off the ground, such as "Too Cool For School" and "Nasty Boys".

Track listing
All songs by Eric Carr, Bruce Kulick and Adam Mitchell except where noted.

Personnel
Eric Carr - drums, lead and backing vocals, keyboards, bass, acoustic guitar
Bruce Kulick - lead and rhythm guitars
Adam Mitchell - keyboards, backing vocals

References

External links
Interview with Adam Mitchell

 Rockology on Spotify

1999 albums
Kiss (band)
Eric Carr albums
Albums published posthumously
Spitfire Records albums